The discography of American actor Leonard Nimoy consists of 5 studio albums and 4 compilations.

During and following Star Trek, Nimoy also released five albums of musical vocal recordings on Dot Records. On his first album, Mr. Spock's Music from Outer Space, and half of his second album Two Sides of Leonard Nimoy, science fiction-themed songs are featured where Nimoy sings as Spock. On his final three albums, he sings popular folk songs of the era and cover versions of popular songs, such as "Proud Mary" and Johnny Cash's "I Walk the Line". There are also several songs on the later albums that were written or co-written by Nimoy. Describing how his recording career got started, Nimoy stated; The albums were popular and resulted in numerous live appearances and promotional record signings that attracted crowds of fans in the thousands. The early recordings were produced by Charles Grean, who may be best known for his version of "Quentin's Theme" from the mid-sixties Gothic soap opera Dark Shadows. In addition to his own music career he directed a 1984 music video for The Bangles' "Going Down to Liverpool". He makes a brief cameo appearance in the video as their driver.

Studio albums

 Leonard Nimoy Presents Mr. Spock's Music from Outer Space (Dot Records), (1967)
 Two Sides of Leonard Nimoy (Dot Records), (1968)
 The Way I Feel (Dot Records, Stereo DLP 25883), (1968)
 The Touch of Leonard Nimoy (Dot Records, Stereo DLP 25910), (1969)
 The New World of Leonard Nimoy (Dot Records, Stereo DLP 25966), (1970)

Spoken word albums 

 The Martian Chronicles (Caedmon Records, 1976)
 Illustrated Man (Caedmon Records, 1977)
 War of the Worlds (Caedmon Records, 1977)
 Green Hills of Earth (Caedmon Records, 1977)
 The Mysterious Golem (JRT Records, 1982)

Singles (45s) 

 "The Ballad of Bilbo Baggins" / "Cotton Candy" (Dot Records, 1967)
 "Theme from Star Trek" / "Visit to a Sad Planet" (Dot Records, 1967)
 "I'd Love Making Love to You" / "Please Don't Try to Change My Mind" (Dot Records, 1968)
 "Consilium" / "Here We Go 'Round Again" (Dot Records, 1968)
 "The Sun Will Rise" / "Time to Get It Together" (Dot Records, 1969)
 "Outer Space" / "Inner Mind" (Paramount Records, 1970)

Cassettes 

 Leonard Nimoy / Micro-Cassette (Dot Records, release date unknown)
 You Are Not Alone (MCA Records, 1987)

Compilations

 Highly Illogical (Rev-Ola Records, UK, 1993)
 Leonard Nimoy Presents: Mr. Spock's Music from Outer Space (Varése Sarabande, US, 1995)
 Spaced Out: The Very Best of Leonard Nimoy & William Shatner (Universal Music/Space, Canada, 1997)

Samples in songs
 "Theme from Gutbuster" (2000) - song by Bentley Rhythm Ace on their album For Your Ears Only samples Nimoy's "The Ballad of Bilbo Baggins"
 "What's on Your Mind (Pure Energy)" (1988) - song by American synthpop band Information Society that uses a sample of Nimoy's voice from the Star Trek episode "Errand of Mercy".

References

External links
Discography frame at Thanks to Leonard Nimoy fanpage
recordings at The Official Leonard Nimoy Fanclub
Maiden Wine Comprehensive site dedicated to the musical career of Leonard Nimoy.
 The Leonard Nimoy Album Page
Leonard Nimoy Discography at Discogs

Discographies of American artists
Pop music discographies
Discography